William Crain may refer to:

 William H. Crain (1848–1896), U.S. Representative from Texas
 William Crain (filmmaker) (born 1949), American film and television director
 William C. Crain (1798–1865), American physician and politician

See also
William Crane (disambiguation)